Shitushuguan station is a station on Line 2 of the Xi'an Metro which started operations on 16 September 2011.

References

Railway stations in Shaanxi
Railway stations in China opened in 2011
Xi'an Metro stations